Pat Tsz Wo is a village in Fo Tan, Sha Tin District, Hong Kong.

Administration
Pat Tsz Wo is a recognized village under the New Territories Small House Policy.

See also
 Kau Yeuk (Sha Tin)

References

External links

 Delineation of area of existing village Pat Tsz Wo (Sha Tin) for election of resident representative (2019 to 2022)

Villages in Sha Tin District, Hong Kong
Fo Tan